Pitcairnia hooveri is a species of flowering plant in the family Bromeliaceae. It was first described by Harry Edward Luther in 1991 as Pepinia hooveri. It is endemic to Ecuador, where it grows in coastal and mountain forest habitat. There are four known subpopulations, none of which is in a protected area.

References

hooveri
Endangered plants
Endemic flora of Ecuador
Plants described in 1991
Taxonomy articles created by Polbot